The Doubble Donkey Disc is the second studio album by American rock band Ozma.

Track listing

Personnel
 Daniel Brummel – vocals, bass, balalaika
 Pat Edwards – drums
 Jose Galvez – guitar, vocals
 Ryen Slegr – vocals, guitar, balalaika
 Star Wick – keys, flute

References

2002 albums
Ozma (band) albums